Marshall Springs, Texas is an unincorporated community in Titus County, in the U.S. state of Texas. Marshall Springs is seven miles northwest of county seat, Mount Pleasant, located on two county roads, and with no reliable source of history, lacks a known population figure.

References

Unincorporated communities in Texas
Unincorporated communities in Titus County, Texas